Sahara Net is an information and communications technology provider (ICT) serving the Saudi market, the company has rapidly grown since 1989 to offer various complementary services such as connectivity, internet, hosting, cloud, optimization, cyber security, and managed services.

History
Sahara Net is a Saudi Joint Stock Company (JSC) and its history goes back to 1989 when Sahara Net established the 1st Saudi Bulletin Board Service (BBS) in the Kingdom. During this period, it operated as a hub for email exchange in the FidoNet network. And in 1994 Sahara Net started offering Internet connectivity and other related services like internet email, web design, web hosting, and Domain name registry services. These services made the first ISP in Saudi Arabia before the official licensing in 1998, when the Saudi Internet market was regulated and Sahara Net received Internet Service Provider(ISP) license and was appointed as the official Local Internet Registry (LIR) in the Kingdom of Saudi Arabia.

Today
The company grew over these years to become one of the main ICTs in the Saudi market, extending network coverage to all major cities in Saudi Arabia, and offering various connectivity options to corporate as well as home users. In 2009 the company was partially acquired by Telindus (the ICT investment arm of Belgacom), the famous telecom operator in Belgium and Europe. Then, in 2014 the company was fully acquired by its original founders. Recently, Sahara Net was converted from an LLC to a JSC  with over 1200 shareholders by a capital raise (original founders still control 70% of the shares).

Certifications
Another achievement is when Sahara Net received the following certifications:
 ISO 9001:2015
 ISO 20000:2018
 ISO 27001:2013
 ISO/IEC 27017:2017
 ISO/IEC 27018:2019

Solutions & Products

Official Website
http://www.sahara.com

Internet in Saudi Arabia
Cloud computing
Computer security
Information sensitivity
Internet service providers
Internet hosting
Technology companies of Saudi Arabia
Information technology companies of Saudi Arabia
Saudi Arabian websites